A Clan in Need is one of three entries in a spin-off original English-language manga series based on the Warriors novel series. The book was published by Tokyopop on 23 March 2010 and drawn by James L. Barry under the pen name Erin Hunter.

Plot summary
Ravenpaw and Barley wake up in the Moonstone cave. They had previously traveled there after being chased from their home on a farm by a group of former BloodClan cats.

While asleep at the Moonstone, Ravenpaw had received a dream from StarClan. It helped him realize that the cats of ThunderClan, his birth Clan, would help him drive out the BloodClan cats. On their way to ThunderClan, they encounter a patrol of WindClan and ThunderClan cats squabbling over a lost WindClan kit. Ravenpaw and Barley had found the kit on their way, so they returned the kit to WindClan and went with ThunderClan back to their camp. When they reach the camp, Firestar appears. He asks what's brought Barley and Ravenpaw to ThunderClan. They tell him everything, and Firestar agrees to help. However, while they are in the camp, some ThunderClan cats return from a hunting patrol, badly injured. The duo then learns that more BloodClan cats have been attacking ThunderClan patrols, and that Firestar must help ThunderClan before he can send anyone to save the farm. Firestar invites Ravenpaw and Barley to stay for as long as they need.

The next day, Ravenpaw and Barley go on a hunting patrol with ThunderClan. As they return, they are attacked by BloodClan cats. There is a short fight, during which one of the BloodClan cats, Snipe, seems to recognize Barley. BloodClan succeeds in stealing ThunderClan's prey, and retreats. Shortly afterwards, Firestar and Graystripe ask Barley for help in finding BloodClan's home in the Twolegplace, so they can take the fight to them. Barley takes offense and runs off into the forest.

The next day, Rainpaw, a ThunderClan apprentice, returns from hunting. He says that he and his sister Sorrelpaw were attacked by BloodClan and that Sorrelpaw is badly hurt. Barley goes with the rescue patrol, and when he sees Sorrelpaw's injuries, he makes up his mind to help ThunderClan. He goes to Firestar to tell him everything he knows, and decides to find his sister, because she might know more. When Barley and Ravenpaw find her, she tells them that BloodClan is getting organized again. Violet leads them to a friend of hers, Mitzi. Mitzi's son, Fritz, was kidnapped by BloodClan one moon before. She followed the cats when they took him and learned where their home was. She gladly takes them there.

The cats return to ThunderClan to tell Firestar where BloodClan lives. He gathers a battle patrol. They slip out of camp and head to the BloodClan camp. When they arrive, they find all of BloodClan assembled below Ice and Snake, Barley and Violet's brothers. Violet walks forward to them. She calls to them, telling them that their names are Jumper and Hoot and that she is their sister. They are unconcerned and pretend not to remember her.

Firestar gives the order to attack. The cats fight, and ThunderClan wins. Ice and Snake plead for mercy. Barley tells them that they've been attacking cats and stealing prey, so now they must pay. Ice and Snake try to avoid punishment by claiming that they never did anything, and the rest of BloodClan is at fault. With that, BloodClan turns on them and they drive their leaders away. The cats leave, and Firestar promises Ravenpaw that when his Clan has rested, he will lead a patrol to drive the other BloodClan cats from the farm.

Critical reception 
"Jolley does a fine job of capturing the essence of Erin Hunter's Warriors series and integrating the numerous Clans with their differing codes and loyalties into a tightly paced plot. Readers unfamiliar with the earlier books can easily become immersed in the story, save for the slight confusion of Barley being the main focal point of the cover when Ravenpaw is the narrator. Otherwise, sharply drawn feral and ferocious expressions heighten tension whenever there is a standoff and add a proper dose of frenzy to the action scenes. The black-and-white drawings may have some children lamenting the chance to see the colors of the gloriously described cat fur, but ultimately it won't matter with Warriors fans clamoring for anything related to the series." — Joanna K. Fabicon, School Library Journal.

Publication list 
 A Clan in Need (EN), HarperCollins (paperback), 23 March 2010
 Rabenpfotes Abenteuer (DE),Tokyopop (paperback), 12 May 2011
 На подмогу племени (RU), OLMA Media Group (paperback), 2012
 En klan i knipe (NO), Juritzen Jr. (unknown binding), 15 June 2018
 A Clan in Need (EN), HarperCollins (paperback; colored reprint), 26 June 2018

References

2010 American novels
2010 fantasy novels
Warriors (novel series)
American fantasy novels
Children's fantasy novels
Original English-language manga
HarperCollins books
2010 children's books
Novels about cats